Cities of the Heart is a Jack Bruce double CD release of sections of two live performances given on 2 and 3 November 
1993 in Cologne, Germany, to celebrate Bruce's 50th birthday. They were recorded for the WDR "Rockpalast" TV show and a DVD of the shows, entitled Rockpalast: The 50th Birthday Concerts, was released by MIG Music in 2014.

Track listing

Disc one
 "Can You Follow?" (Pete Brown, Jack Bruce) – 1:56
Jack Bruce – vocals, piano
 "Running Through Our Hands" (Brown, Bruce, Janet Godfrey) – 4:13
Jack Bruce – vocals, piano
Gary Husband – keyboards
 "Over the Cliff" (Bruce, Jerry Goldsmith) – 3:46
Jack Bruce – bass
Dick Heckstall-Smith – saxophone
Ginger Baker – drums
 "Statues" (Bruce) – 7:37
Jack Bruce – bass
Dick Heckstall-Smith – saxophone
Ginger Baker – drums
 "First Time I Met the Blues" (Eurreal Montgomery) – 4:47
Jack Bruce – vocals, bass
Clem Clempson – guitar
Dick Heckstall-Smith – saxophone
Ginger Baker – drums
 "Smiles & Grins" (Bruce, Brown) – 9:48
Jack Bruce – vocals, bass, piano
Clem Clempson – guitar
Dick Heckstall-Smith – saxophone
Art Themen – saxophone
Bernie Worrell – Hammond organ
Malcolm Bruce – synthesizer
Gary Husband – drums
 "Bird Alone" (Bruce, Brown) – 9:56
Jack Bruce – vocals, bass
Clem Clempson – guitar
Bernie Worrell – Hammond organ, piano
Gary Husband – drums
 "Neighbor, Neighbor"(Alton, J.Valler) – 5:32
Jack Bruce – vocals, bass
Clem Clempson – guitar
Dick Heckstall-Smith – saxophone
Art Themen – saxophone
Henry Lowther – trumpet
John Mumford – trombone
Bernie Worrell – Hammond organ
Simon Phillips – drums
 "Born Under a Bad Sign" (William Bell, Booker T. Jones) – 6:17
Jack Bruce – vocals, bass
Clem Clempson – guitar
Dick Heckstall-Smith – saxophone
Art Themen – saxophone
Henry Lowther – trumpet
John Mumford – trombone
Bernie Worrell – Hammond organ
Jonas Bruce – piano
Simon Phillips – drums

Disc two
 "Ships in the Night" (Brown, Bruce) – 5:20
Jack Bruce – vocals
Maggy Reilly – vocals
Clem Clempson – acoustic guitar, electric guitar
Malcolm Bruce – acoustic guitar
Bernie Worrell – Hammond organ
Gary Husband – piano
François Garny – bass
Simon Phillips – drums
 "Never Tell Your Mother She's Out of Tune" (Brown, Bruce) – 4:19
Jack Bruce – vocals, piano
Clem Clempson – guitar
Dick Heckstall-Smith – saxophone
Art Themen – saxophone
Henry Lowther – trumpet
John Mumford – trombone
François Garny – bass
Simon Phillips – drums
 "Theme for an Imaginary Western" (Brown, Bruce) – 6:00
Jack Bruce – vocals, piano
Clem Clempson – guitar
Bernie Worrell – Hammond organ
François Garny – bass
Simon Phillips – drums
 "Golden Days" (Bruce) – 5:38
Jack Bruce – vocals, piano
Gary "Mudbone" Cooper – vocals
Clem Clempson – guitar
Bernie Worrell – Hammond organ
François Garny – bass
Simon Phillips – drums
 "Life on Earth" (Bruce) – 5:21
Jack Bruce – vocals, bass
Gary Moore – guitar
Simon Phillips – drums
 "N.S.U." (Bruce) – 6:29
Jack Bruce – vocals, bass
Gary Moore – guitar
Ginger Baker – drums
 "Sitting on Top of the World" (Lonnie Chatmon, Walter Vinson) – 6:52
Jack Bruce – vocals, bass
Gary Moore – guitar
Ginger Baker – drums
 "Politician" (Brown, Bruce) – 5:39
Jack Bruce – vocals, bass
Pete Brown – vocals
Gary Moore – guitar
Ginger Baker – drums
 "Spoonful" (Willie Dixon) – 9:13
Jack Bruce – vocals, bass
Gary Moore – guitar
Ginger Baker – drums
 "Sunshine of Your Love" (Brown, Bruce, Eric Clapton) – 8:07
Jack Bruce – vocals, piano
Gary "Mudbone" Cooper – vocals
Clem Clempson – guitar
Malcolm Bruce – acoustic guitar
Dick Heckstall-Smith – saxophone
Art Themen – saxophone
Henry Lowther – trumpet
John Mumford – trombone
Bernie Worrell – Hammond organ
Jonas Bruce – synthesizer
François Garny – bass
Ginger Baker – drums
Simon Phillips – drums
Pete Brown – percussion

Personnel
Musicians
 Pete Brown – vocals, percussion
 Jack Bruce – bass, piano, vocals
 Jonas Bruce – piano
 Malcolm Bruce – keyboards
 Dave "Clem" Clempson – guitar
 Gary "Mudbone" Cooper – vocals
 François Garny – bass
 Gary Husband – drums, keyboards, piano
 Henry Lowther – trumpet
 John Mumford – trombone
 Maggie Reilly – vocals
 Art Themen – saxophone
 Ginger Baker – drums
 Dick Heckstall-Smith – saxophone
 Gary Moore – guitar
 Simon Phillips – drums
 Bernie Worrell – piano

 Production
 Cedric Beatly – recording
 David Calvin – recording
 Norbert Gutzman – assistant engineer
 Harald Glaser – live recording submixes
 Walter Quintus – mixing
 Ulf von Kanitz – art direction
 Guido Harari – b/w and colour photos
 Nanna Botsch – colour photos
 Ralph Weber – photo of the Bruce family
 Malcom Bruce – transcriptions
 Klaus Schruff – computer music notation

References

1994 live albums
Jack Bruce albums
albums produced by Jack Bruce